Briony Christine "Bree" Cole (born 28 February 1983) is a retired Australian diver who won a gold medal at the 2006 Commonwealth Games, silver and bronze medals at the 2007 World Championships and a silver medal at the Beijing 2008 Olympics, and a bronze medal at the 2010 Commonwealth Games.

Life
Briony Christine Cole was born in Melbourne in 1983.

As a child, Cole competed in gymnastics, which led her to diving. With Sharleen Stratton, she won gold at the Commonwealth Games in the 3 m synchronised event. She backed that up in 2007 with a silver and bronze medal at the World Championships. Then in 2008, with Melissa Wu she won a silver in the 10 m synchronised platform at the Beijing Olympics.

Cole was born to Mary and Wayne Cole and has an elder sister Sian. She has bachelor degrees in teaching and applied science (human movement, 2005) from Deakin University. After retiring from competitions she worked for the Australian Sports Commission as a regional coordinator in the Active After-School Communities program.

References

1983 births
Living people
Australian female divers
Commonwealth Games gold medallists for Australia
Commonwealth Games bronze medallists for Australia
Divers at the 2008 Summer Olympics
Olympic divers of Australia
Olympic silver medalists for Australia
Divers at the 2010 Commonwealth Games
Olympic medalists in diving
Australian Institute of Sport divers
Sportswomen from Victoria (Australia)
Medalists at the 2008 Summer Olympics
Divers from Melbourne
Deakin University alumni
Commonwealth Games medallists in diving
Universiade medalists in diving
Universiade bronze medalists for Australia
Medalists at the 2005 Summer Universiade
20th-century Australian women
21st-century Australian women
Medallists at the 2010 Commonwealth Games